NTF may refer to:

Biology 
 Neurotrophic factors, a family of biomolecules

Organizations 
 National Society for Road Safety, a Swedish road safety organization
 National Task Force, of the Swedish police
 National Turkey Federation, US
 Nigeria Trust Fund
 Norsk Toppfotball, a Norwegian football organization
 Norwegian Tobacco Workers' Union
 Norwegian Transport Workers' Union, a trade union in Norway
 Norwegian Union of Textile Workers
 Number Theory Foundation, US

Technology 
 Nachrichtentechnische Fachberichte, a German engineering journal
 National Transonic Facility, a US wind tunnel
 National Transfer Format, for geospatial information, UK
 No Trouble Found, a maintenance term

See also 
NTFS, a file system developed by Microsoft
NFT (disambiguation)